Little Marsh may refer to three places in England:

Little Marsh, Buckinghamshire, a hamlet in Marsh Gibbon parish
Little Marsh, Norfolk, a hamlet in Field Dalling parish
Little Marsh, Wiltshire, a hamlet in Semington parish